Johann Heinrich Hübschmann (1 July 1848 – 20 January 1908) was a German philologist.

Life
Hübschmann was born on 1 July 1848 at Erfurt. He studied Oriental philology at Jena, Tübingen, Leipzig, and Munich; in 1876 he became professor of Iranian languages at Leipzig, and in 1877 professor of comparative philology at Strasbourg. Hübschmann died on 20 January 1908 in Freiburg im Breisgau.

Research on the Armenian language
Hübschmann was the first to show in 1875 that the Armenian language was not a branch of the Iranian languages (earlier assumed so because of the immense amount of Iranian influence on Armenian throughout its history) but an entirely separate Indo-European branch in its own right. He used the comparative method to separate the Iranian loanwords, which make up the majority of Armenian words, from an older layer of native Armenian words.

Works
"Ueber die Stellung des Armenischen im Kreise der indogermanischen Sprachen" (1875)
Armenische Studien (1883)
Das indogermanische Vokalsystem (1885)Etymologie und Lautlehre der ossetischen Sprache (1887)Persische Studien (1895)
 Armenische Grammatik. I. Theil. Armenische Etymologie. I. Abtheilung: Die persischen und arabischen Lehnwörter im Altarmenischen. Leipzig, 1895
 Armenische Grammatik. I. Theil. Armenische Etymologie (Bibliothek indogermanischer Grammatiken. Band VI), Leipzig, 1897Altarmenische Ortsnamen'' (1904)

References

Attribution

German philologists
German non-fiction writers
1848 births
1908 deaths
Writers from Erfurt
German male non-fiction writers
Armenian studies scholars